Nasirabad or Nasir Abad may refer to:

Bangladesh
 Mymensingh, Bangladesh, formerly named Nasirabad

India
 Nasirabad, Ajmer in Rajasthan, India
 Nasirabad, Raibareli in Uttar Pradesh, India

Iran

Ardabil Province
 Nasirabad, Kowsar, a village in Kowsar County
 Nasirabad, Meshgin Shahr, a village in Meshgin Shahr County
 Nasirabad, Meshgin-e Sharqi, a village in Meshgin Shahr County

Chaharmahal and Bakhtiari Province
 Nasirabad, Borujen, a village in Borujen County
 Nasirabad, Farsan, a village in Farsan County
 Nasirabad-e Galeh, a village in Farsan County
 Nasirabad, Dasht-e Zarrin, a village in Kuhrang County
 Nasirabad, Shurab-e Tangazi, a village in Kuhrang County
 Nasirabad, Lordegan, a village in Lordegan County

East Azerbaijan Province
 Nasirabad, Charuymaq, a village in Charuymaq County
 Nasirabad-e Olya, a village in Hashtrud County
 Nasirabad-e Sofla, a village in Hashtrud County
 Nasirabad (38°26′ N 46°46′ E), Varzaqan, a village in Varzaqan County
 Nasirabad (38°29′ N 46°44′ E), Varzaqan, a village in Varzaqan County

Fars Province
Nasirabad, Arsanjan, a village in Arsanjan County
Nasirabad, Darab, a village in Darab County
Nasirabad, Eqlid, a village in Eqlid County
Nasirabad, Fasa, a village in Fasa County
Nasirabad, Jahrom, a village in Jahrom County
Nasirabad, Kazerun, a village in Kazerun County
Nasirabad, Neyriz, a village in Neyriz County

Hamadan Province
 Nasirabad, Hamadan, a village in Famenin County
 Nasirabad, Kabudarahang, a village in Kabudarahang County

Isfahan Province
 Nasirabad, alternate name of Nasrabad, Isfahan, a city in Isfahan County
 Nasrrabad, Kashan, a village in Kashan County
 Nasirabad, Lay Siyah, a village in Nain County

Kerman Province

Khuzestan Province
 Nasirabad, Hendijan, a village in Hendijan County

Lorestan Province
 Nasirabad, Borujerd, a village in Borujerd County, Lorestan Province, Iran
 Nasirabad, Khorramabad, a village in Khorramabad County, Lorestan Province, Iran

Markazi Province
 Nasirabad, Khondab, a village in Khondab County
 Nasirabad, Zarandieh, a village in Zarandieh County

Mazaandaran Province
 Nasirabad, Sari, a village in Sari County
 Nasirabad, Tonekabon, a village in Tonekabon County

North Khorasan Province
 Nasirabad, alternate name of Nasrabad, North Khorasan, Iran

Qazvin Province
 Nasirabad, Qazvin, Iran
 Nasirabad, alternate name of Naserabad, Qazvin, Iran
 Nasirabad-e Sadat, a village in Takestan County, Qazvin Province, Iran

Razavi Khorasan Province
 Nasirabad, Khvaf, a village in Khvaf County, Razavi Khorasan Province, Iran
 Nasirabad, Nishapur, a village in Nishapur County, Razavi Khorasan Province, Iran
 Nasirabad, Zaveh, a village in Zaveh County, Razavi Khorasan Province, Iran

Semnan Province

South Khorasan Province
 Nasirabad, Birjand, a village in Birjand County
 Nasirabad, Qaen, a village in Qaen County
 Nasirabad, Tabas, a village in Tabas County

Tehran Province
 Nasirabad, Tehran, a city in Iran
 Nasirabad, Varamin, a village in Varamin County, Tehran Province, Iran

West Azerbaijan Province
 Nasirabad, West Azerbaijan, a village in Urmia County

Zanjan Province
 Nasirabad, Khorramdarreh, a village in Khorramdarreh County
 Nasirabad, Mahneshan, a village in Mahneshan County
 Nasirabad, Zanjan, a village in Zanjan County

Pakistan
 Nasirabad Tehsil in the Qambar Shahdadkot District in Sindh, Pakistan
 Nasirabad (Hunza) in Hunza Valley, Pakistan
 Nasirabad Division in the Balochistan, Pakistan
 Nasirabad District in the Balochistan, Pakistan

See also 
 Naseerabad (disambiguation)
 Nasrabad (disambiguation)